Lucknow NER railway division is railway division under North Eastern Railway zone of Indian Railways. This railway division was formed on 14 April 1952.

Izzatnagar railway division (at Bareilly City) and Varanasi railway division are the other two railway divisions under NER Zone headquartered at Gorakhpur.

List of railway stations and towns 
The list includes the stations under the Lucknow NER railway division and their station category. 

Stations closed for Passengers -

References

 
Divisions of Indian Railways
1952 establishments in Uttar Pradesh